Yaniv Perets (born March 4, 2000) is a Canadian college ice hockey goaltender for Quinnipiac University.

Playing career

Amateur
During the 2018–19 season, Perets appeared in 36 games for the Boston Junior Bruins of the United States Premier Hockey League (USPHL), where he posted a 23–10–1 record, with a 2.48 goals-against-average (GAA), and a .929. save percentage. He helped lead the Bruins to the  Dineen Cup as league champions and was named NCDC Goaltender of the Year. In October 2018, he committed to play college ice hockey for the Quinnipiac Bobcats during the 2020–21 season.

During the 2019–20 season, he appeared in 37 games for the Penticton Vees of the British Columbia Hockey League (BCHL), where he posted a 25–8–1 record, with a 2.19 GAA, a .918 save percentage and five shutouts. He ranked second in the BCHL in shutouts, third in GAA, fifth in wins and sixth in save percentage. During the postseason he posted a 4–0–1 record with a 1.96 GAA and .921 save percentage before the tournament was cancelled due to the COVID-19 pandemic.

During the 2020–21 season, he played 10 games for the Vees in the BCHL's training season before it was paused due to the COVID-19 pandemic. He posted a 9–1–0 record, with a 1.80 GAA, a .931 save percentage and two shutouts. He was tied for first in the league in shutouts, ranked second in wins and was fourth in GAA and save percentage and helped lead the team to the BCHL's Okanagan Cup.

Collegiate
On January 19, 2021, it was announced he was added to the Quinnipiac Bobcats' roster for the second semester. He made his collegiate debut for the Bobcats on February 13, 2021, and recorded five saves in 14:49 in a 9–0 win against Colgate.

During the  2021–22 season he posted a 22–5–2 record with a 1.17 GAA, .939 save percentage and 11 shutouts. He was named the ECAC Hockey player of the month for four consecutive months from November to February. He led the NCAA in save percentage, GAA and shutouts. He also set the ECAC Hockey league record in save percentage, GAA, and shutouts, putting together one of the best goaltending seasons in the history of the league. Following an outstanding season, he was named to the All-ECAC Hockey First Team, ECAC Hockey Player of the Year and won the Ken Dryden Award. He was also named a top-ten finalist for the Hobey Baker Award, a top-three finalist for the Mike Richter Award and was named an AHCA East Second Team All-American.

Career statistics

Awards and honours

References

External links
 

2000 births
Living people
AHCA Division I men's ice hockey All-Americans
Canadian expatriate ice hockey players in the United States
Canadian ice hockey goaltenders
Ice hockey people from Quebec
Jewish ice hockey players
People from Dollard-des-Ormeaux
Penticton Vees players
Quinnipiac Bobcats men's ice hockey players